Philip Haywood Glenister (born 10 February 1963) is an English actor. He is best known for his role as DCI Gene Hunt in the BBC series Life on Mars (2006–2007) and its sequel Ashes to Ashes (2008–2010). He also played DCI William Bell in State of Play (2003) and Reverend Anderson in Outcast (2016–2018).

Early life

Glenister was born in Harrow, Middlesex, and grew up in Hatch End. He is the son of director John Glenister and Joan Glenister, and the younger brother of fellow actor Robert Glenister. He is of Welsh ancestry from his maternal side. He attended Hatch End High School, and with the encouragement of his then-sister-in-law Amanda Redman, he pursued acting and attended the Central School of Speech and Drama.

Career
In the early 1990s, Glenister appeared in various TV series including Minder, The Ruth Rendell Mysteries, Heartbeat, The Chief, Dressing for Breakfast and Silent Witness. In 1997, he appeared in Sharpe's Justice as Richard Sharpe's half-brother Matt Truman. He played William Dobbin in the 1998 mini-series Vanity Fair.

From 1998 to 1999, Glenister co-starred as a mini-cab driver who aspires to be a rock star in the series Roger Roger. He also played factory boss Mack Mackintosh in the first three series of Clocking Off from 2000 to 2002. In 2001, he appeared in two of the Hornblower TV films as Horatio's antagonist Gunner Hobbs.

Glenister played the photographer who took nude photos for a Women's Institute fundraising calendar in the 2003 feature film Calendar Girls. Also in 2003, he appeared in the mini-series State of Play. Glenister played the German commandant, Baron Heinrich von Rheingarten, in the 2004 mini-series Island at War about the Occupation of the Channel Islands during World War II.

In April 2006, Glenister read the Bedtime Story for the BBC's children's channel, CBeebies. He returned to the slot in February/March 2007.

Glenister played social reformer and estate manager Mr Carter in the 2007 BBC costume drama Cranford, as part of a cast including Judi Dench and Francesca Annis.

Glenister is probably best known for his role as DCI Gene Hunt in Life on Mars (2006–07), co-starring with John Simm as Sam Tyler,  and its sequel Ashes to Ashes (2008–10), with Keeley Hawes as Alex Drake.  Glenister also worked with Simm on State of Play and Clocking Off and the 2008 crime film Tuesday. Upon announcement of the film, Glenister joked that he and Simm were contractually obliged to work with each other once a year.

Glenister starred as demon hunter Rupert Galvin in the 2009 ITV drama Demons. He used an American accent for the role, which received some criticism from reviewers. After the series was cancelled, he said he had problems with the role and felt that he may have been miscast.

In 2010, Glenister had a small role (credited as 'Poker Friend') in Woody Allen's You Will Meet a Tall Dark Stranger, and he played Charles Forestier in a 2011 feature film of Guy de Maupassant's Bel Ami. He starred in the 2011 conspiracy thriller Hidden on BBC One. 

In 2011, Glenister reunited with John Simm once more in the Sky TV mini-series Mad Dogs about a group of old friends whose holiday in Majorca takes an unexpected turn. After a successful reception, the cast returned for a second run of the series in 2012. The show ran for two more series after that in 2013. Those two series consisted of four and two episodes respectively. Glenister played Captain Smollett in Sky1's adaptation of Treasure Island, broadcast at Christmas 2012. Glenister also appeared in the 2012 premiere of the play This House.

In 2013, Glenister starred in the final episode of Agatha Christie's Poirot, starring David Suchet, entitled "Curtain". He also played the role of Mr Trevor Gunn, a lothario PE teacher in David Walliams' BBC One comedy series Big School.

In 2014, Glenister had a leading role in the Kudos-produced BBC drama, From There to Here, which focuses on the aftermath of the IRA bombing of Manchester in 1996. The show featured his Life on Mars co-star Liz White as his love interest.
That same year, he presented the Channel 4 series For The Love Of Cars with fellow classic car enthusiast Ant Anstead. The two friends were set the challenge of restoring classic cars including a Mini Cooper, Land Rover, DeLorean, MG T-type, Ford Escort and a Triumph Stag. The first series ended after six episodes, in which all six classic cars were sold at a London auction, with the second series being aired in 2015. 

In 2016, Glenister had a leading role in Robert Kirkman's TV adaptation of Outcast, where he played Reverend Anderson, and used an American accent. The show ran for 2 series on Cinemax, before it was cancelled in 2017.

In 2017, Glenister starred in an episode of Inside No. 9 called The Bill. He also worked with his Clocking Off co-star, Lesley Sharp in Living the Dream. This show was about a British family that moved to America. It ran for 2 series before being cancelled in 2019. That year, Glenister presented the true-crime show, What the Killer Did Next on Crime & Investigation.

Glenister appeared in Julian Fellowes' 2020 television adaptation Belgravia, based on Fellowes' novel of the same name. It aired on ITV in the UK and Epix in the USA.

Publications
A book by Glenister on 1970s and 1980s culture, Things Ain't What They Used to Be, was published in October 2008.

Charity work
Glenister is patron of the charity Momentum in Kingston upon Thames, which aims to help children and the families of children undergoing treatment for cancer in Surrey.

Personal life
Glenister has been married to actress Beth Goddard since 2006. Together, they have two daughters named Millie and Charlotte.

Glenister is a supporter of non-league football team Wealdstone FC. He is also known to be a fan of Arsenal FC.

Filmography

Film

Television

Audio

References

External links

 Philip Glenister Fans - unofficial Philip Glenister fan site.
 Life on Mars at the BBC
 BBC Ashes To Ashes official website

1963 births
Living people
20th-century English male actors
21st-century English male actors
Alumni of the Royal Central School of Speech and Drama
English male film actors
English male television actors
Glenister acting family
Male actors from London
People from Harrow, London